Svetha Yallapragada Rao (born January 11, 1986), professionally known as Raja Kumari, is an American rapper, songwriter and singer from Claremont, California. Kumari is best known for her collaboration with notable artists including Gwen Stefani, Iggy Azalea, Fifth Harmony, Knife Party, Fall Out Boy. She is also notable for receiving as a songwriter, the BMI Pop Awards in 2016, and featuring on BBC Asian Network programme Bobby Friction on July 5, 2016.

Life 
Raja Kumari is born as Svetha Yallapragada Rao in Claremont, California to Telugu parents from Andhra Pradesh, India. Kumari holds a Bachelor of Arts degree in religious studies, with an emphasis on South Asian religions.

Her parents played an important role in developing her Indian character and trained her to become an Indian classical dancer who started performing at the age of 5. In an interview with Rolling Stones,  Raja Kumari said that she found it tough and lonely as a South Indian girl growing up in Los Angeles.

While in fifth grade, Kumari discovered hip hop through the Fugees' album The Score. By the age of 14, she was a noticed freestyle MC known as "Indian Princess" (IP) or "Raja Kumari". She is a trained dancer in Kuchipudi, Kathak, and Bharatanatyam and had given many live performances in Ravindra Bharathi in Hyderabad.

During her artist career, she has contributed to several philanthropic activities through her performances including the creation of a hospital in Bangalore and a meditation hall in Hyderabad for the Vegesna Foundation, a school for children with physical disabilities. As a result, Kumari has been recognized as a benefactor by the Foundation for Indic Philosophy and Culture (Indic Foundation) and has been honored with the Kohinoor Award for excellence in the Classical Arts by the Governor of Tamil Nadu.

Career
Kumari co-wrote, featured in or performed background vocals in a number of notable songs including Fall Out Boy's double-platinum single "Centuries",  "Change Your Life" feat. T.I., Vicetone's  "Don't You Run", Brave Enough by Lindsey Stirling and "Set Me Free" for Baz Luhrmann's original Netflix series The Get Down about the birth of Hip Hop. She has also contributed to songs in albums by Gwen Stefani, Fifth Harmony (Reflection), Twin Shadow, and Dirty South. Recently she released her debut solo single "Mute"  featuring Elvis Brown and produced by Jules Wolfson at Epic Records. which premiered on Paper Magazine's website. In May 2016, Kumari was honored at the 2016 BMI Pop Awards for co-writing the song "Centuries" with Fall Out Boy. In addition, she has a recording contract with Epic Records through L.A. Reid and collaborated with several players in the music industry, including artists Polow Da Don, J.R. Rotem, Timbaland, Rodney Jerkins, Soulshock and Karlin, Tricky Stewart and The-Dream, Justin Tranter and Fernando Garibay. She has also been inspired in her music style by the Indian composer and producer A. R. Rahman. In 2018, she co-wrote and performed the song titled 'Roots' and 'City Slums' in collaboration with Divine. She has starred in Gully Boy as a judge, which was a cameo appearance. In 2019, she finally made her debut in mother tongue Telugu by featuring in 'Attention Everybody', a single produced by SouthBay (subsidiary of Ramanaidu Studios), Music composed by Kone Kone and the Telugu lyrics penned by Pranav Chaganty, which was a tribute to Telugu actor Venkatesh Daggubati released on his birthday.

She has been nominated for an MTV European Music Awards three times for Best India Act. She hosted the American Music Awards Pre-Show telecast, alongside Lauren Jaregui. Kumari has also been announced as the face of MAC Cosmetics' holiday campaign: #MACStarringYou, in which she appears in adverts and marketing materials around the globe. She was a judge on season one of MTV Hustle, a rap battle competition show.

In 2022, she started her own independent label, Godmother Records.

Filmography

Film music

Discography

EPs and mixtapes

Singles and collaborations

Songwriting credits

Television / Web series

References

External links
 

1986 births
Living people
People from Claremont, California
Singer-songwriters from California
American women singer-songwriters
American people of Telugu descent
American women artists of Indian descent
American women singers of Indian descent
American expatriates in India
Expatriate musicians in India
21st-century American singers
21st-century American women singers